The FA Cup 1976–77 is the 96th season of the world's oldest football knockout competition; The Football Association Challenge Cup, or FA Cup for short. The large number of clubs entering the tournament from lower down the English football league system meant that the competition started with a number of preliminary and qualifying rounds. The 28 victorious teams from the Fourth Round Qualifying progressed to the First Round Proper.

Preliminary round

Ties

Replays

1st qualifying round

Ties

Replays

2nd replays

2nd qualifying round

Ties

2nd replays
|}

Replays

2nd replays

3rd qualifying round

Ties

Replays

4th qualifying round
The teams that given byes to this round are Matlock Town, Altrincham, Morecambe, Dartford, Bishop's Stortford, Ilford, Walton & Hersham, Hendon, Gateshead United, Chelmsford City, Grantham, Boston United, Blyth Spartans, Kettering Town, Weymouth, Wycombe Wanderers, Leatherhead, Hitchin Town, Tooting & Mitcham United and Marine.

Ties

Replays

1976–77 FA Cup
See 1976–77 FA Cup for details of the rounds from the First Round Proper onwards.

External links
 Football Club History Database: FA Cup 1976–77
 FA Cup Past Results

Qualifying Rounds
FA Cup qualifying rounds